Haven is an unincorporated community in the town of Mosel in Sheboygan County, Wisconsin, United States. The community is located east of I-43 between Sheboygan, Wisconsin and Cleveland, Wisconsin.

History
A military camp called Camp Haven was named after the community. The camp operated from 1949 until November 16, 1959. as an anti-aircraft testing range. The land was sold to Wisconsin Power and Light for a planned nuclear power plant called Haven Nuclear Power Plant. After plans never materialized, the Whistling Straits golf resort was built on the site, which hosted the Ryder Cup in 2021.

References

Unincorporated communities in Wisconsin
Unincorporated communities in Sheboygan County, Wisconsin